Jingle is an extension to XMPP (Extensible Messaging and Presence Protocol) which adds peer-to-peer (P2P) session control (signaling) for multimedia interactions such as in Voice over IP (VoIP) or videoconferencing communications. It was designed by Google and the XMPP Standards Foundation.  The multimedia streams are delivered using the Real-time Transport Protocol (RTP).  If needed, NAT traversal is assisted using Interactive Connectivity Establishment (ICE).

, the proposed Jingle specification had not yet been approved by the XMPP Standards Foundation, but is now a Draft Standard, meaning: "Implementations are encouraged and the protocol is appropriate for deployment in production systems, but some changes to the protocol are possible before it becomes a Final Standard."

The libjingle library, used by Google Talk to implement Jingle, has been released to the public under a BSD license. It implements both the current standard protocol and the older, pre-standard version.

Clients supporting Jingle 
 Asterisk PBX
 Coccinella
 Conversations (software)
 Empathy (using Telepathy framework)
 FreeSWITCH
 Gajim from 0.14 (not on Windows yet)
 Google Talk for Gmail, Android, Windows
 iChat for Apple OS X
 Jitsi (multiplatform support using Java)
 KDE Telepathy (using Telepathy framework)
 Kopete
 Miranda NG (via JGTalk plugin)
 Monal IM-Client for iOS
 Pidgin
 Psi
 QIP Infium
 Yate/YateClient supports Jingle in both client and server mode, audio and file transfer, also call transfer and DTMF.
Though not an instant messaging client, RemoteVNC uses Jingle as one of the screen sharing means.

Notes

References

External links 
 XMPP Standards Foundation

Instant messaging protocols
VoIP protocols
XMPP